Russell Ingall (born 24 February 1964 in London, England) is a former full-time Australian V8 Supercar driver. He won his V8 Supercars title in 2005, and finished second in 1998, 1999, 2001 and 2004. Ingall has also won the Bathurst 1000, in 1995 and 1997. His particular driving style earned him the nickname "Enforcer".

Early years
Ingall was born in England and moved to Port Adelaide in South Australia with his father at the age of three. His father was a motor mechanic and operated a service station, his mother passed away from breast cancer at a young age.

Ingall began his motor racing career at age 12 competing at the Whyalla go-kart track in South Australia. After winning an Australian Junior and several Senior karting Championships he moved overseas to race karts in Europe before making the transition into Formula Ford. During his karting career he lost his right-index finger at the first joint in an accident, however this didn't affect his racing.

Competing in only his second Formula Ford event, Ingall finished third in a support race at the 1988 Australian Grand Prix in Adelaide. Over the next few years Ingall proved to be a force in the Motorcraft Formula Ford Driver to Europe Series finishing runner-up before claiming the crown in the 1990. In 1990, he co-drove a Bob Forbes Racing Holden Commodore VL at the Bathurst 1000 with Kevin Bartlett

Ingall headed to Europe in 1991. After almost claiming the British Formula Ford Championship in 1991, and making a promising debut in the GM-Lotus formula, Ingall moved to Germany to drive for Team Schübel in the German Formula Three Championship. Ingall also had the opportunity to compete in Peter Wearing Smith's team at the Macau Grand Prix, where he started 23rd and overtook David Coulthard to finish in fifth position.

Over the northern winter Ingall competed in the New Zealand Formula Ford series, winning easily with 10 victories from 12 races.

Ingall made history in 1993 returning to the United Kingdom to drive for the factory Van Diemen team to win 13 out of the 16 races in the British Formula Ford Championship and in the process recording the highest number of wins in a single season in the history of Formula Ford.

The season was finished off by winning one of the most prestigious single-seater events – the Formula Ford Festival and World Cup at Brands Hatch in England.

Ingall was never able to live up to his full potential in Europe due to a lack of funding and later returned to Australia. This was common for Australian race drivers in Europe.

V8 Supercar

Part-time drives

After spending the first half of 1994 in the Japanese Formula 3 Championship Ingall made his return to Touring Cars, having previously driven for the Bob Forbes Racing team in 1990, driving for Wayne Gardner Racing at the Sandown 500 and Bathurst 1000. Ingall and Win Percy led at Bathurst for some time before finishing fifth.

Perkins Engineering

Ingall went on to win the 1995 British Formula Renault Championship before joining Perkins Engineering for its campaign for the endurance races back in Australia. Ingall figured prominently in the team's epic last to first victory at Bathurst. He would then become a permanent face of the V8 Supercar Championship throughout 1996 season.

During his first year, Ingall claimed his maiden victory at Calder Park and then went on to win the Bathurst 1000 for the second time in 1997. He also finished second in 1998 and 2002.

In his seven years with Perkins Engineering, Ingall finish runner-up in the championship three times (1998, 1999 and 2001) and was third in 1997.

Stone Brothers Racing

Following seven years with the Perkins team Ingall moved to Stone Brothers Racing at the start of 2003 in winning style taking out the support races at the Australian Grand Prix.

He also went on to win rounds at the Queensland 300 and the Gillette V8 Supercar Challenge at the Lexmark Indy 300 on the Gold Coast, Queensland before eventually finishing seventh outright in the championship.

In 2004 Ingall was again consistent with the highlight of the season coming with a round win at Symmons Plains in round 12. In the final round at Eastern Creek Raceway, he finished third overall to jump from fourth to second in the championship in his Caltex Ford Falcon BA and give Stone Brothers Racing an historic 1–2 finish as his teammate Marcos Ambrose won the championship.

In 2005 Ingall went one better, collecting his first V8 Supercar championship after having been runner-up four times. Ingall went into the season with a plan and he followed it to the final race of the season, which was held at the Phillip Island circuit. He raced "smarter" than he ever had before and worked out his strategy around the V8 Supercars points system to collect the title ahead of Craig Lowndes and Marcos Ambrose.

In 2006 Ingall saw the championship slip from his grasp due to poor performance from his car which saw him finish the championship in eighth place.

In the lead-up to the 2007 season finale, Ingall announced he was Holden bound, thus leaving Stone Brothers Racing and Ford after five years. He finished the championship for the first time outside the top 10, placing a disappointing eleventh. For 2008 Ingall moved to Paul Morris Motorsport.

Supercheap Auto Racing

Ingall returned to the Holden fray in 2008 with Paul Morris Motorsport, now sponsored by automotive parts retailer Supercheap Auto. Ingall's debut race meeting for his new team proved less than ideal.  Finishing in 14th place in the first leg of the Clipsal 500, contact with the wall at Turn 8 during the morning warmup saw steering and suspension damage to the No. 39 car.  Repairs were made in time for the start of Race 2, but the car was not the same, and he retired after just two laps, with failure in the ignition system.

“If I didn't stick it in (during) the warm up, the distributor drive would have probably gone in the warm-up so we would have found the problem before the race, so one thing led to another," said Ingall. "At the end of the day it was all related to the shunt.”

In 2010, Ingall was joined by New Zealander Greg Murphy. Ingall remained with Paul Morris Motorsport until the end of 2011.

In 2012, Ingall moved to Walkinshaw Racing, with the Supercheap Auto sponsorship.

In 2013, Ingall continued the use of the No. 66 car, however, 2013 saw the change to the new Holden VF Commodore. Ingall's form for the year thus far has been inconsistent. At Townsville, Ingall celebrated his 226th race start (a new record beating John Bowe's 225) by using No. 226 on his car. In the Endurance events, Ingall teamed up with IndyCar racer Ryan Briscoe.

Lucas Dumbrell Motorsport

After toying with the idea of retiring from full-time motorsports in 2014, Ingall announced returned to V8 Supercars in the 2014 season with Lucas Dumbrell Motorsport.

At the end of 2014, Ingall retired from full-time driving. He will still compete as a co-driver in the three endurance races.

Return to V8 Supercars

In 2015, Ingall signed with the Holden Racing Team to race in the endurance series after James Courtney was injured in a freak accident. Ingall competed in the Sandown 500 and the Bathurst 1000 with HRT. 

With Courtney returning to race in the Gold Coast 600, Prodrive Racing Australia signed Ingall as a replacement for Chaz Mostert, who was unable to drive due to injuries from his Bathurst crash.

Nissan Motorsport

Ingall signed with Nissan Motorsport to race in the Pirtek Enduro Cup in 2016 and joined Rick Kelly in the No. 15 Nissan Altima.

Triple Eight Race Engineering
Ingall made a return to the championship in a Triple Eight Race Engineering wildcard in the 2021 Bathurst 1000 alongside Broc Feeney in a Supercheap Auto backed #39 Holden Commodore ZB.

Other racing

In October 2018, Ingall made his Stadium Super Trucks debut at Sydney Motorsport Park. He finished seventh and fifth in the weekend's two races. The following year, he returned to the series for the Gold Coast 600 round. In April 2021, Ingall took over for the injured Nash Morris for the series' final two races at Symmons Plains.

Media career

In 2015, Ingall was appointed a co-host on Fox Sports coverage of V8 Supercars with five-time champion and former rival Mark Skaife.

Ingall hosts an online video series titled Enforcer and The Dude alongside Paul Morris.

In October 2020, Ingall became the brand ambassador for Soudal Australia for their innovative range of sealants, expanding foams and adhesives. Soudal are best known for their sealant adhesive called T-Rex which fixes, bonds and seals everything to everything.

Career results

Complete Australian Touring Car Championship results
(key) (Races in bold indicate pole position) (Races in italics indicate fastest lap)

Complete Bathurst 1000 results

* Super Touring race

Stadium Super Trucks
(key) (Bold – Pole position. Italics – Fastest qualifier. * – Most laps led.)

Boost Mobile Super Trucks
(key) (Bold – Pole position. Italics – Fastest qualifier. * – Most laps led.)

 Season in progress.

TCR Australia results

References

External links
 Ingall's Official Website
 Driver Database stats
 

Supercars Championship drivers
British Formula Renault 2.0 drivers
German Formula Three Championship drivers
Japanese Formula 3 Championship drivers
1964 births
Living people
Bathurst 1000 winners
Formula Ford drivers
Australian Touring Car Championship drivers
Stadium Super Trucks drivers
Australian people of English descent
Sportspeople from London
Racing drivers from South Australia
Australian Endurance Championship drivers
Kelly Racing drivers
Nismo drivers
BMW M drivers
Stone Brothers Racing drivers